Roma is a 2004 Argentine-Spanish drama film directed by Adolfo Aristarain and starring Juan Diego Botto, Susú Pecoraro and José Sacristán.

Plot
Young journalist Manuel Cueto (Juan Diego Botto) is sent by his publisher boss to help solitary novelist Joaquín Góñez (José Sacristán) finish his long-overdue last book. Brought out of his loneliness by the young man, Joaquín reminisces about his youth and experiences in Buenos Aires, as well as his intense relationship with his mother Roma.

Cast
 Juan Diego Botto as Manuel Cueto/Joaco
 Susú Pecoraro as Roma Di Toro
 José Sacristán as Joaquín Góñez
 Agustín Garvíe as Joaco
 Vando Villamil as Áteo Di Toro
 Marcela Kloosterboer as Reneé
 Maximiliano Ghione as Guido
 Marina Glezer as Alicia
 Gustavo Garzón as Joaquín father
 Carla Crespo as Betty
 Marcos Mundstock as Gustavo Smirnoff
 Raúl Rizzo as Doctor Cassano
 Jean Pierre Noher as Pando
 Alberto Jiménez as Publisher (son)
 María Galiana as Portera
 Jane Darwell as Ma Joad (archive footage)
 Henry Fonda as Tom Joad (archive footage)

Critical reception
Jonathan Holland, film critic for Variety magazine and reporting from the San Sebastián International Film Festival, liked the film and wrote, "Argentine helmer Adolfo Aristarain turns a compassionate eye toward his own spiritual and political education in the rangy, quietly affecting and rewardingly intense Roma, his most achieved work to date. Lengthy, but not over-long, rites-of-passage yarn takes one young man's life as the focal point for the struggles which tore Argentina apart in the late '60s and '70s, as well as being an homage to the dangerous pleasures of self-discovery. Film garnered positive reactions at home on its spring release and has the emotional coherence to strike universal chords offshore."

See also
 List of Spanish films of 2004
 List of Argentine films of 2004

References

External links
 
 
 Roma at the cinenacional.com 
 Roma review at La Nación by Diego Batlle 
 

2004 films
2004 drama films
Films shot in Buenos Aires
Films shot in Madrid
Argentine independent films
2000s Spanish-language films
Spanish independent films
2000s Spanish films
2000s Argentine films